Ju-jitsu competition at the 2017 Asian Indoor and Martial Arts Games was held in Ashgabat, Turkmenistan from 16 to 19 September 2017 at the Martial Arts Arena.

Medalists

Duo

Men's contact

Men's ne-waza

Women's ne-waza

Medal table

Results

Duo

Men's classic
16 September

Men's show
16 September

Women's classic
16 September

Women's show
16 September

Mixed classic
16 September

Mixed show
16 September

Preliminary round

Knockout round

Men's contact

62 kg
16 September

69 kg
16 September

77 kg
16 September

85 kg
16 September

Men's ne-waza

56 kg
19 September

62 kg
19 September

69 kg
18 September

77 kg
18 September

 Ahmed Mansoor Shebeeb of Bahrain originally won the bronze medal, but was disqualified after he tested positive for Mesterolone.

85 kg
18 September

94 kg
18 September

+94 kg
18 September

Open
19 September

Women's ne-waza

45 kg
19 September

49 kg
19 September

55 kg
19 September

62 kg
18 September

70 kg
18 September

+70 kg
19 September

Open
19 September

References 
 Medalists by events

2017 Asian Indoor and Martial Arts Games events
2017